is a Japanese medical drama remake of the 2013 South Korean television series of the same name, about a person on the autism spectrum who becomes a pediatric surgeon. It aired on Thursdays at 22:00 (JST) from July 12 to September 13, 2018 on Fuji TV, and starred Kento Yamazaki, Juri Ueno, and Naohito Fujiki.

Plot
Minato Shindo (Kento Yamazaki) is autistic with savant syndrome. He has an amazing memory and keen spatial skills, but he finds it difficult to communicate with others.
Minato aspires to become a doctor because his older brother died when they were young. He later meets doctor Akira Shiga (Akira Emoto) and amazes him with his ability to remember all the human organs at a young age. Doctor Akira decides to support Minato and with his recommendation, Minato eventually enters the world of pediatric surgery as a resident.

Cast

Main
 Kento Yamazaki as Minato Shindo
 Junta Ito as young Minato
 Juri Ueno as Natsumi Seto
 Naohito Fujiki as Seiji Takayama

Supporting
 Akira Emoto as Akira Shiga 
 Yuri Nakamura as Michi Togo
 Kenta Hamano as Taro Hashiguchi
 Itsuji Itao as Ryunosuke Inoguchi
 Shigeyuki Totsugi as Keisuke Mamiya
 Kodai Asaka as Nakajima
 Daigo Matsui as Marui
 Ryosuke Ikeoka as Nonomura
 Risaki Matsukaze as Iyo Morishita
 Airi Matsui as Shiori Morishita 
 Yua Kawashima as Nao Aisawa 
 Taiyo Saito as Rintaro Takechi 
 Reju Kojima as Keita Tomioka

Guest Appearance
 Rento Oyama as Kota (ep.1)
 Nishihara Aki as Kota's mother (ep.1)
 Kiara Minegishi as Masaki (ep.1)
 Anna Yamada as Yuina Sugawara (ep.2)
 Asuka Kurosawa as Sugawara Maki (ep.2)
 Kotone Nakajima as Mai Ishiyama (ep.3)
 Saki Takenoya as Miyu Ichikawa (ep.3)
 Aki Maeda as Shiori Ichikawa (ep.3)
 Saki Takamatsu as Akari Oishi (ep.4)
 Jun Murakami as Oishi san (ep.4)
 Elen as Kaoru Oishi (ep.4)
 Kairi Jyo as Hibiki Hayama (ep.5)
 Masaki Miura as Hibiki's father (ep.5)
 Keiko Horiuchi (ep.6)
 Yukiko Shinohara as Rika Mizuno (ep.6)
 Mayuko Fukuda as Nanako (ep.7)
 Kisetsu Fujiwara as Kentaro (ep.7)
 Souma Torigoe as Haruto Hayami (ep.8)
 Yuto Ikeda as Shota Hayami (ep.8)
 Riku Hagiwara as Ryohei Takigawa (ep.7-9)
 Koen Kondo (ep.10)
 Eri Murakawa (ep.10)
 Rin Furukawa as Misaki (ep.10)
 Kaito Yoshimura as Masaya Takayama (Seiji Takayama's brother)
 Kanau Tanaka as Sota Shindo (Minato Shindo's older brother)

Production

Development
On May 26, Fuji TV first announced that they would make an adaptation of Good Doctor with Kento Yamazaki as the lead actor. Several days later, other supporting cast members were announced.

A special screening of the first episode was held on July 8, 2018, with three of the main leads in attendance.

Filming
Filming began around June 17, 2018.

Ratings
Good Doctor received good ratings, with its first airing at 11.5%, the highest rating for its time slot in the last 2 years.

International broadcast
Starting on July 21, 2018, the drama aired on WakuWaku Japan in Indonesia, Myanmar, Singapore, Thailand, Taiwan, Sri Lanka, Mongolia, and Vietnam, on Saturdays at 21:00 (SGP), 20:00 (JKT).

References

External links
 

2018 Japanese television series debuts
Autism in television
Fuji TV dramas
Japanese medical television series
Japanese drama television series
Japanese television series based on South Korean television series